Fritz Baier (June 2, 1923 – March 3, 2012) was a German politician of the Christian Democratic Union (CDU) and former member of the German Bundestag.

Life 
Baier was a member of the German Bundestag from 26 June 1956, when he succeeded his party friend Eugen Leibfried, until 1976. Since 1957 he represented the constituency of Sinsheim in parliament.

Literature

References

1923 births
2012 deaths
Members of the Bundestag for Baden-Württemberg
Members of the Bundestag 1969–1972
Members of the Bundestag 1965–1969
Members of the Bundestag 1961–1965
Members of the Bundestag 1957–1961
Members of the Bundestag 1953–1957
Members of the Bundestag for the Christian Democratic Union of Germany